Kyrgyzstan elects on the national level a head of state – the president –  and a legislature. The president is elected for a tenure of single six-year term by the people (previously, the term length was four years and briefly five years). The Supreme Council (Joghorku Keneš) is composed of 120 members filled by proportional representation.

Latest elections

Presidential elections

Parliamentary elections

Past elections and referendums

Parliamentary elections

2005

69 seats were won by the ruling party and 6 were won by the opposition. Observers said there  "some technical improvements over the first round" but stressed that there remained "significant shortcomings." Following the Tulip Revolution the incomplete results were never complete and the interim president, Kurmanbek Bakiev initially postponed a new round of elections to later in the year, but subsequently put them off beyond 2005.

2000
 Assembly of People's Representatives – 20 February and 12 March 2000
 Legislative Assembly – 20 February and 12 March 2000

Election results: Total seats by party in the Supreme Council were as follows:
 Union of Democratic Forces – 12 (Naryn, Jalalabad)
 Communists – 6 (Bishkek, Tokmok, Isilkul, Talas, Osh)
 My Country Party of Action – 4
 Independents – 73
 Other – 10

note: These results include both the Assembly of People's Representatives and the Legislative Assembly.

1995
 Assembly of People's Representatives – 5 February 1995
note: not all of the 70 seats were filled at the 5 February 1995 elections; as a result, run-off elections were held at later dates; the assembly meets twice yearly
 Legislative Assembly – 5 February 1995
note: not all of the 35 seats were filled at the 5 February 1995 elections; as a result, run-off elections were held at later dates
note: the legislature became bicameral for the 5 February 1995 elections

See also
 Electoral calendar
 Electoral system

References